Michael Hugh Harold Bedford-Jones (1942 – April 18, 2021) was the Canadian Anglican Bishop of Trent-Durham, one of the Suffragan Bishops for the Diocese of Toronto.

Bedford-Jones was educated at Trinity College, Toronto  and ordained in 1968. After a curacy at Toronto Cathedral he held incumbencies in the city.  He was a suffragan bishop in the Diocese of Toronto from 1994 until his retirement in 2008.

Bishop Michael died from COVID-19-related complications at an Oshawa, Ontario hospital on April 18, 2021, aged .

References 

20th-century births
2021 deaths
Trinity College (Canada) alumni
Anglican bishops of Toronto
20th-century Anglican Church of Canada bishops
21st-century Anglican Church of Canada bishops
People from Toronto
Deaths from the COVID-19 pandemic in Canada